Ha Jae-hoon may refer to:
 Ha Jae-hoon (footballer, born 1965), South Korean footballer who played for Yukong 
 Ha Jae-hoon (footballer, born 1984), South Korean footballer who played for Gangwon FC
 Ha Jae-hoon (baseball) (born 1990), South Korean baseball player